Cephetola dolorosa is a butterfly in the family Lycaenidae. It is found in Sudan and Uganda. Its habitat consists of forests.

References

Butterflies described in 1954
Poritiinae